The Jaú National Park is a national park located in the state of Amazonas, Brazil.
It is one of the largest forest reserve in South America, and part of a World Heritage Site.

Location

The name "Jaú" comes from that of one of the largest fish in Brazil, the gilded catfish or jau (Zungaro zungaro), after which the main river of the park is named.
The park is in the Amazon biome in the Japurá-Solimões-Negro moist forests ecoregion.
It was created by decree 85.200 of 24 September 1980.
It is administered by the Chico Mendes Institute for Biodiversity Conservation.
It covers parts of the municipalities of Barcelos, Codajás and Novo Airão in the state of Amazonas.

The park is one of the largest protected areas in Brazil.
All three rivers flow east to enter the right bank of the Rio Negro.
The eastern part of the park adjoins the Rio Unini Extractive Reserve to the north, which runs along the opposite bank of the Unini River.
The park is bounded to the northwest by the Amanã Sustainable Development Reserve.
To the east, near the Rio Negro, the park adjoins the Rio Negro State Park North Section to the south.

Environment

The park's terrain is representative of the Negro-Solimões interfluvial plateau.
It has two main areas: the Trombetas/Negro plateau and the lower western Amazon plateau.
There are large areas of seasonally flooded land with poor drainage, and some permanent lakes.

Vegetation types are dense rainforest (77%), open rainforest (14%), transition from rainforest to campinarana (7%) and campinarana (2%).
Botanists have catalogued about 400 plant species, several of which are restricted to certain environments such as the uplands and the flooded areas.
263 species of fish have been recorded, some new to science.

Conservation

The park is classed as IUCN protected area category II (national park).
The objective is to preserve an Amazonian black water ecosystem for environmental education, interaction with local communities, sustainable tourism and the research. 
The park is designed as a mega-reserve and world heritage site for present and future generations.
Protected species in the park include the margay (Leopardus wiedii), jaguar (Panthera onca), giant otter (Pteronura brasiliensis) and Amazonian manatee (Trichechus inunguis).

Jaú National Park was inscribed by UNESCO as a  World Heritage Site  in 2000.
It became part of the Central Amazon Ecological Corridor, established in 2002.
In 2003 the property was expanded by the addition of the Anavilhanas National Park, Amanã Sustainable Development Reserve and Mamirauá Sustainable Development Reserve to form the Central Amazon Conservation Complex, a larger World Heritage Site.
The park became part of the Lower Rio Negro Mosaic, created in 2010.
The conservation unit is supported by the Amazon Region Protected Areas Program. 

Another reason why the Jaú park is conserved is that of the group of people that call themselves the "okampha" (Oh//camp//ah). The Okampa originated in the park long before it had even been discovered, having been living there for almost two centuries. They are a very secluded people who never show themselves to tourists or even other native groups that live there. Very few people have had the opportunity to actually see an okamphian.

Notes

Sources

1980 establishments in Brazil
National parks of Brazil
World Heritage Sites in Brazil
Protected areas of Amazonas (Brazilian state)